Fernando Vázquez Rodríguez most known as Fer Vázquez (born 15 May 1994) is an Uruguayan singer and songwriter, known for being the vocalist of the cumbia pop band Rombai since 2014.

Career 
In 2016 he participated in the reality show Bailando por un Sueño, in its 11th edition. That same year he participated acting in the documentary film  Marama - Rombai - El viaje, personifying himself. On February 26, 2017, he performed as vocalist of Rombai at the Quinta Vergara Amphitheater, participating for the first time in the Viña del Mar International Song Festival.

Discography

With Rombai 

 2014: «Locuras contigo»
 2015: «Yo también»
 2015: «Curiosidad»
 2015: «Noche loca» ft. Márama
 2015: «Adiós»
 2015: «Segundas intenciones»
 2015: «Yo te propongo»
 2016: «Reencuentro»
 2016: «Olvida ese hombre»
 2016: «Enamorarnos no»
 2016: «Perdí tu amor»
 2016: «Abrazame»
 2016: «Cuando se pone a bailar»
 2017: «Sentí el sabor»
 2017: «Una y otra vez»
 2017: «Besarte»
 2017: «Que rico que baila» ft. Márama
 2018: «Me voy»
 2019: «Me voy (Remix)» ft. Abraham Mateo and Reykon
 2019: «2 Pa' 2
 2019: «Piénsalo» ft. MYA
 2019: «Don Juan»  ft. Ventino
 2019: «Ganitas»

Singles 

 2014: «Una noche contigo» ft. Márama
 2016: «Te conozco» ft. Márama
 2015: «Aventura» ft. Niko Falero
 2015: «Déjate Llevar»
 2015: «Tenemos que hablar»

With the stage name Rombai 
 2019: «Japón»

References 

21st-century Uruguayan male singers
Singers from Montevideo
1994 births
Living people
Participants in Argentine reality television series
Bailando por un Sueño (Argentine TV series) participants